Texico is a city in Curry County, New Mexico, United States.  Its population was 1,130 at the 2010 census.  The city is located on the Texas-New Mexico border with the town of Farwell across the border.

Etymology
The name is a portmanteau of "Texas" and "New Mexico". Texico is located on the Texas-New Mexico border. The city of Farwell borders Texico on the Texas side of the border.

Geography
Texico is located on the high plains of Eastern New Mexico in a region known as the Llano Estacado.

Demographics
As of the census of 2000,  1,065 people, 381 households, and 278 families were residing in the city. The population density was 1,299 persons per square mile (501.5/km). The 414 housing units  averaged 504.9 per sq mi (194.9/km). The racial makeup of the city was 59.15% White, 4.60% African American, 1.22% Native American, 0.09% Asian, 0.09% Pacific Islander, 31.46% from other races, and 3.38% from two or more races. Hispanics or Latinos of any race were 47.32% of the population.

Of the 381 households, 37.3% had children under the age of 18 living with them, 55.4% were married couples living together, 11.8% had a female householder with no husband present, and 26.8% were not families. About 23.9% of all households were made up of individuals, and 12.3% had someone living alone who was 65 years of age or older. The average household size was 2.80, and the average family size was 3.34.

In the city, the age distribution was 30.8% under 18, 8.6% from 18 to 24, 28.1% from 25 to 44, 19.7% from 45 to 64, and 12.8% who were 65 or older. The median age was 34 years. For every 100 females, there were 97.2 males. For every 100 females age 18 and over, there were 89.5 males.

The median income for a household in the city was $24,519, and for a family was $29,554. Males had a median income of $23,672 versus $15,250 for females. The per capita income for the city was $10,584. About 17.3% of families and 20.9% of the population were below the poverty line, including 18.8% of those under age 18 and 19.4% of those age 65 or over.

Climate
According to the Köppen climate classification, Texico has a semiarid climate, BSk on climate maps.

Education
Texico is within the Texico Municipal Schools school district.

Popular culture

Texico is also featured in the Egyptian film Viva Zalata starring Fouad Al-Mohandes, a parody of the classic film Viva Zapata.

Texico is the name of the town in the 2008 movie Swing Vote starring Kevin Costner. Although the name of the city was used, the actual filming was done in Belen, south of Albuquerque.

See also

 List of municipalities in New Mexico
 Texico, Illinois

References

External links

 
 Public domain photos of the Llano Estacado

Cities in Curry County, New Mexico
Cities in New Mexico